Laurie Magnus (5 August 1872 – 28 April 1933) was an English author, journalist, and publisher.

Biography
Magnus was born in London to Jewish parents Katie and Sir Philip Magnus. He was educated at St Paul's School, and graduated with a Master of Arts from Magdalen College, Oxford, where he read classics.

He was the Berlin correspondent of the London Morning Post (1896–1900) and leader-writer for the same paper. By 1904, he was a joint managing director of George Routledge & Sons. Magnus edited a series of Secondary Education Text-Books for the publishing house of John Murray, has published A Primer of Wordsworth, translated the first volume of Greek Thinkers (from the German of Theodor Gomperz), and has edited Prayers from the Poets and Flowers of the Cave (in conjunction with Cecil Headlam). He also wrote written Aspects of the Jewish Question (1902), reprinted and enlarged from the Jewish Quarterly Review.

Magnus unsuccessfully ran as a Unionist for Bristol North in the December 1910 British general election, and was a major in the Royal Defence Corps during World War I. He was active in Jewish communal life as a warden of the West London Synagogue, a member of the council of Jews' College, and president of the Union of Jewish Literary Societies.

Partial bibliography

References
 

1872 births
1933 deaths
Royal Defence Corps officers
British Army personnel of World War I
Military personnel from London
19th-century British Jews
19th-century English writers
20th-century British Jews
20th-century English writers
Alumni of Magdalen College, Oxford
British Reform Jews
English Jewish writers
English publishers (people)
Jewish non-fiction writers
People educated at St Paul's School, London